Balaa is a 2018 Pakistani thriller television series aired on ARY Digital. It is produced by Fahad Mustafa and Dr. Ali Kazmi under their banner Big Bang Entertainment. It stars Bilal Abbas Khan, Ushna Shah, Azekah Daniel, Samina Peerzada, Sajid Hassan, Ismat Zaidi and Mehar Bano. The series follows the story of a limping girl who destroys the lives of people around her due to her own insecurities and imperfections.

Plot
Nigar (Ushna Shah) is a selfish and cruel girl who is impaired from her leg by birth. She never lets her imperfection be an obstacle in her way instead, she intends to harm others to fill her ego. Her cruel attitude is just because of her father, Zafar (Sajid Hassan) who has also the same mindset as Nigar and has spoiled her because she has been lucky for him since her birth. Zafar also has a son, Junaid (Asad Siddiqui) who is not so special for him as Nigar is. Junaid has married an orphan girl Zeba who is unattractive most of all, she doesn't have a wealthy background as greedy Zafar has always wanted. Nigar also mistreats her and uses Junaid every single time to make her live with trouble. Zafar and Nigar has always wanted to get rid of her.

Nigar is in love with her cousin, Taimoor (Bilal Abbas Khan), a handsome and family-oriented man whose family she and Zafar have had been degrading for their low status in the past but not for long as now Taimoor is living a successful life. Taimoor loves Saba (Azekah Daniel), the only daughter of his mother's friend (Ismat Zaidi). This makes her become Nigar's second target. Fortunately, she catches Saba with her boyfriend, Mateen, and provokes them to elope, on the day of nikkah as she will aid them. On the other hand, she uses Mateen to make mute calls to Zeba (Ammara Chaudhary) so Junaid suspects that she is having an affair. So, as planned, Saba elopes with Mateen on the day of nikkah with an apology note and her poor mother dies of embarrassment. Taimoor also gets badly heartbroken.

Nigar succeeds in clearing the second target and has also partially clear the first target. The leftover part is done by Zafar who bribes Mateen to be in Zeba's room when she's home alone. The plan is followed with perfection and Junaid arrives at the moment. Zafar and Nigar succeed in making Junaid divorce Zeba although she tries her best to prove her sincerity. The next morning, Zeba is found dead in the washroom. The cause is revealed to be a brain hemorrhage. Mission accomplished.

Now, Nigar heads for heartbroken Taimoor. She gradually lures him out of his sorrow and makes him like her. Although Junaid is also badly suffering from the trauma of his wife's death, she doesn't care at all. She has her eyes fixed on Taimoor. She eventually starts mixing up with Taimoor's family. Taimoor's mother, Shama (Samina Peerzada) is a very gentle and caring woman who easily agrees to accept Nigar, although Nigar has been rude to her in the past. Taimoor's younger sister, Batool (Mehar Bano) resists Nigar's presence but her mother won't consider her objection as she wants her son's prosperity back. Saleha (Mehwish Qureshi), Taimoor's older sister, is also an unadorned lady just like her mother but her simplicity is way too elaborated that she can't differentiate what's bad and good. In simple words, she is a type of immature. On the other hand, Batool is a clever, liberal, and sensible girl who easily indicates Nigar's intentions.

Somehow, Taimoor gets affectionate towards Nigar. Zafar conditions the marriage to be a watta satta. Batool doesn't want to marry a heartbroken Junaid who has also become bad-tempered and got in drinking. So, Nigar assures her father that she will marry Batool with Junaid after she marries Taimoor. So, Zafar agrees.

On the wedding night, Taimoor describes his family's importance to her and she should also give them a priority. As it was against Nigar's aptitude, she is overwhelmed and resists in her own gesticulations. Now, Nigar's pivot motive was to get rid of the whole of Taimoor's family. She uses Shama's submissive attitude as her base. Nigar emotionally forces Shama to be a bit distant from Taimoor so he could spend more time with her. Shama foresees heartbroken Taimoor's prosperity in this so she starts being distant from Taimoor. At first, Taimoor objects the weird attitude of his mother but later, he accepts that as a regular fact. And now Shama is not in her way. Now Nigar's next target is Batool.

However Nigar makes Taimoor convinced for Batool and Junaid marriage. After Batool's marriage Taimoor got to know about the truth that Junaid has not left beer. After some days Batool dies accidentally as she comes in front when Junaid was firing and her body falls in the pool. When Taimoor reaches there Nigar set up an act and blamed Batool's ex for her death. The whole family is heartbroken. Now the next target of Nigar was Saleeha. Nigar knew that Saleeha has ovary cancer which can be recovered. But she didn't tell anyone. After some time Saleeha died.

Then after a long leap, the story continues where now Taimoor has a child, Saad, and Shama is mentally ill. As time went by, Taimoor knew about his wife and her wrongdoings.  Nigar wanted Shama to die. Now Saba is back as Mateen divorced her and now she doesn't have any money.  Shama starts visiting her every day. while searching Shama, Taimoor reaches to Saba's house, which annoyed Nigar. 
A while later, Shama dies due to a heart attack.

Now Taimoor got to know the whole truth and doings of his wife by Saba and Batool's ex, Which made Taimoor revengeful.

To succeed in his revenge Taimoor marries Saba and with the help of Saba, he makes Nigar mentally retarded by giving her a very high dose of medicine. And she is in a mental hospital. He tells Zafar everything and leaves.

Cast
Ushna Shah as Nigar; Disabled (limps from birth), Taimoor's cousin and later wife, Shama's niece
Bilal Abbas Khan as Taimoor; Nigar's husband, later married Saba
Azekah Daniel as Saba; Taimoor's love interest and later second wife
Samina Peerzada  as Shama; Taimoor's mother, Nigar and Saba's aunt
Sajid Hassan as Zafar; Nigar and Junaid's father
Mehar Bano as Batool; Taimoor's younger sister, Junaid's wife
Asad Siddiqui as Junaid; Nigar's brother, Batool's husband
Mehwish Qureshi as Saleha; Taimoor's elder sister
Ammara Chaudhary as Zeba; Junaid's ex-wife
Ismat Zaidi as Saba’s mother, Shama's friend
Farah Nadeem as Saleha's mother-in-law

Reception
It gained acclaim for its unique storyline. Sadaf Haider of DAWN praised the series saying, "So far Balaa has been an entertaining with some tight direction and intriguing characters", she further praised Shah's character calling her "highly developed female character". Reviewer from Daily Times praised Khan performance saying, "The actor has left people awestruck with his intense acting". The show has gotten a good response from the viewers; being the top drama series in monday slot airing in Pakistan. It also faced competition with Aatish of Hum TV and Tum Se Hi Talluq Hai of Geo Entertainment and became a slot leader instantly, and got high TRPs as high as 11.2 weekly. It was also criticized of its unnecessarily killing many characters. Khan and Peerzada won Best Actor and Best Supporting Actress respectively at annual ARY Social Media Awards.

International Broadcast

Soundtrack

Track listing

Awards and nominations

References

External links 
 Balaa on ARY Digital.TV
 

Pakistani drama television series
2018 Pakistani television series debuts
Urdu-language television shows